Monginis is an Indian multinational pastry and bakery chain based in Mumbai with outlets in different cities in India and Egypt.

History
Early in the 20th century, two Italian brothers ran a catering service in Mumbai's Fort precinct, which was popular with the city's European residents. In 1958, Monginis catering was taken over by the Khorakiwala family, and became Monginis Foods Private Limited. In 1971, the company adopted the franchise model of business, with a stated emphasis on localized production for local tastes. It also models itself on the "food boutique" concept, focusing on quality, presentation and service. It has thereby expanded its brand and reach across the country with a total worth of about 950 million rupees by 2012.

Products
Monginis sells ready-made as well as order-made cakes for catering or carry-out. Individual cake slices are also kept in Monginis stores for dine-in customers. The chain sells both Indian and Western savouries, including samosas, puffs, cutlets and doughnuts. Apart from these, snack foods and breads are also sold at Monginis shops. Monginis has a product line for diabetics, and offers themed products during festivals. The Egyptian brand has called itself Monginis bakery producing chocolates, cakes, pastries and oriental sweets. Fast food snacks include more than 50 items. Monginis also produce more than 30 different gateaux.

Availability
Monginis also provides accessorized carry-out catering, with telephone and internet ordering options. It counts 1000+ exclusive franchises in total, and at least one production center each, in 38 cities. Besides Mumbai the company is present in Ambernath, Raipur, Patna, Dapoli, Chiplun Ahmedabad, Patan, Himatnagar, Aurangabad, Bangalore, Bhubaneswar, Bhadrak, Bhiwandi, Chennai, Coimbatore, Cuttack, Delhi, Deoria, Goa, Hyderabad, Kochi, Kolkata, Kurnool, Nashik, Pune, Junagadh, Palanpur, Rajkot, Secunderabad, Siwan, Surat and Vadodara. It is also present in most cities in Egypt such as Alexandria, Cairo, 
Suez and Mansoura in Egypt.

Products 
Monginis make various products, cakes, are listed below:
 Cakes
 Pastries
 Chocolates
 Packaged items like Muffins, Cake Bars, Swiss rolls and Brownies
 Confectioneries like Cookies and Biscotti

See also 
 List of bakery cafés

References

Companies based in Mumbai
Bakeries of India
Food and drink companies established in 1958
Bakery cafés
Indian companies established in 1958
1958 establishments in Bombay State
Dawoodi Bohras